A helium focusing cone is a concentration of helium atoms that has passed through the Sun's heliosphere and is concentrated in a conical region on the opposite side from where the particles entered.

See also
 Solar wind

External links 
Observations of the helium focusing cone with pickup ions
The Flow of Interstellar Helium in the Solar System
A Breeze from the Stars, NASA

Sun